In The Church of Jesus Christ (Bickertonite), the Quorum of Twelve Apostles is composed of the chief governing officers of the church. Currently, the president of the church and his two counselors are not separated from the quorum, as the church interprets scriptures as permitting a maximum number of twelve apostles, all of whom should be members of the quorum. Like all ministers of the church, the twelve apostles are volunteers and are not given any compensation for their ministry.

History
At a conference in Green Oak, Pennsylvania in July 1862, leaders of several branches in Pennsylvania, Ohio and Virginia came together and formally organized what they called "The Church of Jesus Christ".  William Bickerton presided over the conference.  Bickerton's two counselors in the newly organized First Presidency were George Barnes and Charles Brown who were ordained apostles.  The members of the Quorum of the Twelve of that organization (ordered by seniority) were Arthur Bickerton, Thomas Bickerton, Alexander Bickerton, James Brown, Cummings Cherry, Benjamin Meadowcroft, Joseph Astin, Joseph Knox, William Cadman, James Nichols, John Neish and John Dixon.  At the conference George Barnes reported receiving the "word of the Lord," which he related:

List of members

Current members of the Quorum of Twelve Apostles are: Thomas M. Liberto, Peter Scolaro, John R. Griffith, Paul Liberto, Leonard A. Lovalvo, James Crudup, Joel Gehly, Frank Natoli, Paul Aaron Palmieri, Jerry Valenti, Pete Giannetti and Scott Griffith.

Joel Gehly currently serves as church president, with Peter Scolaro and Frank Natoli as counselors.

Isaac Smith and Richard T. Christman are currently emeritus apostles.

Notes

References
The Church of Jesus Christ (2005). Faith and Doctrine of The Church of Jesus Christ. Bridgewater, MI: The Church of Jesus Christ.
Valenti, Jerry (1986). "Volume 56", "Welcome to The Church of Jesus Christ". Bridgewater, MI: Gospel News, 9.

Leadership positions in the Church of Jesus Christ (Bickertonite)
Religious organizations established in 1862
1862 establishments in Pennsylvania